The Neptune Pine is an unlocked GSM standalone, full featured smartwatch developed by Canadian consumer electronics and wearable technology company Neptune. It was announced in January 2013 by Simon Tian and launched in November 2013 on Kickstarter. Within 27 hours, the campaign had reached its funding goal of $100,000, and ultimately went on to raise more than $800,000 in 30 days, becoming the highest-funded Canadian Kickstarter campaign at the time.

The device started shipping in August 2014, and eventually became widely available through Best Buy and Amazon, generating around $5 million in total retail sales. It was prominently featured in the 2017 film The Fate of the Furious, the CBS TV series Extant starring Halle Berry and the music video for Smartphones by Trey Songz. The Pine received mixed reviews from the press, generally praising its extensive set of features, while criticizing its large size.

Funding
After a successful campaign on Kickstarter Neptune managed to raise over $800,000 out of a goal of $100,000.

Features
It uses Google Android version 4.1 but is not a Google-licensed device and therefore does not include Google apps or the Google Play store. These apps can be manually added by the user.

The Pine has a Snapdragon S4 system on a chip (SoC) by Qualcomm that has a Cortex-A5 Dual- Core ARM processor running at 1.2 GHz.

The smartwatch has a Capacitive Touch screen, a Wi-Fi web browser, a 5.0 MP rear-facing camera and a VGA front-facing camera, both of them with LED flash, a multimedia player and recorder for music (mp3) and video (mp4), a 3.5mm headphone jack and an internal GPS antenna that supports satellite navigation. Other data inputs are an accelerometer, a gyroscope, a pedometer, and a digital compass.

The Pine smartwatch can be released from the wrist strap by pressing a button on the strap for a better audio signal during a phone call or to take photos with the 5MP rear-facing camera which is otherwise blocked by the strap.

A Micro B USB to USB cable is required to charge the smartwatch. It can also connect to a computer so that the internal SD card can be recognized as a mass storage device for file management.

As a phone, it can be used in conjunction with a Bluetooth headset and can operate in a hands-free manner with its built-in microphone and speakers, also its Bluetooth functionality supports Stereo Bluetooth for wireless music playback and making calls. It offers a talk time of up to 8 hours on 2G and 6 hours on 3G. Internet usage time is up to 7 hours and music playback is up to 10 hours.

The watch was originally intended to be waterproof, but it was discovered that the treatment they wanted to use could not be applied by their manufacturer. Kickstarter backers who wanted waterproofing could have their devices shipped to a third-party, opened, and treated with the aftermarket HzO spray before delivery, however this option is not available at retail.

References

External links
Official website of the Neptune Pine
Engadget.com - Here's what it's like to use a watch as a phone
 XDA-developers.com – Forum: Neptune Pine (stand alone, android, smart watch/phone)
 Neptune Pine chatting community
 Official Neptune Pine videos
 Neptuneninja.com – Resources, apps and hardware guides for the Neptune Pine

Smartwatches